Sellano is a comune (municipality) in the Province of Perugia in the Italian region Umbria, located about 50 km southeast of Perugia. As of 31 December 2018, it had a population of 1,048 and an area of 85.7 km².

Sellano borders the following municipalities: Campello sul Clitunno, Cerreto di Spoleto, Foligno, Trevi, Visso.

Sellano is built on the hill that overlooks the course of the Vigi river, archaeological findings suggest that the site was already inhabited in pre-Roman times and certainly the first development as a feud dates back to the Longobard era.

The municipality of Sellano includes many smaller villages, most of which present elements of considerable historical and architectural interest.

The nature of the surrounding valleys and mountains is pristine and varied, rich in diverse flora and fauna, ideal for eco-tourism and trekking.

Demographic evolution

Notable people
Domenico Mustafà, singer, composer, and papal choir director

References

External links
 Official website

Cities and towns in Umbria